Lane Shi Otayonii is a Chinese musician and interactive multimedia performer based in New York City.

She is known for being the lead vocalist of Boston experimental bands Dent and Elizabeth Colour Wheel, as well as for her solo-project, Otay:onii.

Early life 
Otayonii was born in Haining, China.

Otayonii has said she was a naughty child, but certain life events silenced her as she was growing up, changing her into a shy, quiet person.

In 2010, at age 16, Otayonii moved to the United States from Guangzhou, China.

Influences 
Otayonii's music is influenced by Queenadreena. Otayonii credits Chinese and Mongolian singing with influencing her to sing without boundaries.

Dent 
In 2014, Dent was formed by drummer Jack Whelan, guitarist Harley Cullen, bassist Tristan Allen, and vocalist Otayonii, who all met while attending Berklee College of Music.

The Boston Globe described Otayonii's stage presence at Dent shows as "creating a force field around as much of the room as she can reach". Bandcamp Daily stated Dent's "local notoriety grew with each visceral, concrete-shaking basement performance".

In 2015, the band played a 14-city tour of China that spanned 5,700 miles.

On 12 May 2015, Dent released the album, Eyeballs. Boston Hassle reviewed the album, stating, "with all the low/quiet shifts and endless details it simply begs for repeated listening". Phoebe Fico said Otayonii sounded like, "a lead singer whose voice warbled and waned like Bjork and a Swedish death metal god had a baby".

In 2017, Dent split up after the members graduated from Berklee.

On 7 June 2019, Dent released the album, Bao Bei, which the band had recorded in 2016.

Elizabeth Colour Wheel 
In 2014, Elizabeth Colour Wheel was formed by guitarist Alice Jackson, bassist Bill Cunningham, drummer Connor DeVito, and vocalist Otayonii.

In January 2019, Revolver Mag listed the band on 5 Artists You Need to Know, writing "their live show is something to behold and, impressively, the album manages to capture the same vital energy that exists in their onstage performances."

On 15 March 2019, Elizabeth Colour Wheel released the album, Nocebo, under the label The Flenser. Metal Injection described the album as, "a testament to all that is heavy, beautiful, and twisted." Nine Circles wrote Nocebo, "has that timeless quality that marks a unique and vital voice in the music world." BrooklynVegan called Otayonii's voice "soaring and unique".

In 2022, the band played a 50-show tour of the United States. This was Elizabeth Colour Wheel's first time playing for an audience since 2019 (due to the COVID-19 pandemic). A reviewer at The Austin Chronicle commented on Otayonii's physicality during her performance, involving vibrating, exiting the room mid-song, eating the microphone, and making sounds with the microphone lodged in her mouth. Ghost Cult Mag wrote about ECW’s New York show, “Otayonii disappeared into the crowd: the seemingly disembodied shrieking that begged for exorcism made one forget the vocalist had a corporeal form at all until they reemerged writhing in the center of the floor. This visual, as well as auditory experience, made a great opener for the night.”

Otay:onii 
In 2018, Otayonii released her solo debut, Nag, on ShadowTrash Tape Group, under the stagename, Otay:onii.

In 2021, Otay:onii released the album, M​í​ngM​í​ng 冥冥, on WV Sorcerer Productions. Sputnikmusic described the album as "a forward-thinking work that combined industrial, Chinese folk, glitch and just the bare minimum of pop sensibilities into a spellbinding fever dream of unease and liminal suspense." The music video for M​í​ngM​í​ng 冥冥’s closing track, "Un deciphered", was an official selection by the Silicon Valley Asian Pacific Film Festival.

In 2023, Otay:onii released the album, 夢​之​駭​客 Dream Hacker, on Bié Records. The project came out after she returned from living in China for three years, at the start of the COVID-19 pandemic. Pitchfork gave 夢之駭客 Dream Hacker a 7.4 rating. WBUR called the second track on the album, "W.C.", "crushingly eerie".

In March 2023, Otay:onii performed at SXSW. In April 2023, she will perform at Roadburn Festival.

Performance art 

 Naked Winger, Stovefactory Gallery, Charlestown, Massachusetts, 2015
 Muted Jiji, Whisper 局部振动, Mountain Store, Chengdu, China, 2018
 Unwrap! 包裹之外, at Ming Contemporary Art Museum in Shanghai, China, 2021
 A Returning of A One that Must be Loved, Wonderville, Brooklyn, New York, 2015—2023

Awards and honors

References 

Avant-garde singers
Body art
Chinese contemporary artists
Chinese performance artists
Experimental pop musicians
Feminist artists
Feminist musicians
Indie pop musicians
Indie rock musicians
Living people
Lo-fi musicians
Musicians from Shanghai
Political music artists
Postmodern artists
Women conceptual artists
21st-century Chinese actresses
21st-century Chinese artists
21st-century Chinese women singers
21st-century women artists
Chinese film actresses
Video game musicians